Tomohiro Tanaka is a Japanese mixed martial artist. He competed in the Lightweight division.

Mixed martial arts record

|-
| Loss
| align=center| 3-4-1
| Ken Komoda
| Submission (armbar)
| Zst - Swat! in Face 9
| 
| align=center| 1
| align=center| 0:54
| Tokyo, Japan
| 
|-
| Loss
| align=center| 3-3-1
| Tomonori Ohara
| TKO (punches)
| Shooto - Shooto
| 
| align=center| 1
| align=center| 2:03
| Tokyo, Japan
| 
|-
| Loss
| align=center| 3-2-1
| Naoki Sakurada
| KO
| Shooto - Shooto
| 
| align=center| 2
| align=center| 0:00
| Tokyo, Japan
| 
|-
| Win
| align=center| 3-1-1
| Yuji Ito
| KO (punch)
| Shooto - Shooto
| 
| align=center| 1
| align=center| 0:00
| Tokyo, Japan
| 
|-
| Loss
| align=center| 2-1-1
| Kazuhiro Kusayanagi
| Submission (armbar)
| Shooto - Shooto
| 
| align=center| 1
| align=center| 0:00
| Osaka, Japan
| 
|-
| Draw
| align=center| 2-0-1
| Noboru Asahi
| Draw
| Shooto - Shooto
| 
| align=center| 4
| align=center| 3:00
| Tokyo, Japan
| 
|-
| Win
| align=center| 2-0
| Suguru Shigeno
| KO
| Shooto - Shooto
| 
| align=center| 3
| align=center| 0:00
| Tokyo, Japan
| 
|-
| Win
| align=center| 1-0
| Masanori Yoneyama
| Decision (unanimous)
| Shooto - Shooto
| 
| align=center| 3
| align=center| 3:00
| Tokyo, Japan
|

See also
List of male mixed martial artists

References

External links
 
 Tomohiro Tanaka at mixedmartialarts.com

Japanese male mixed martial artists
Lightweight mixed martial artists
Living people
Year of birth missing (living people)